The casualties of the Napoleonic Wars (1803–1815), direct and indirect, are broken down below.

Note that the following deaths listed include both killed in action as well as deaths from other causes: diseases such as those from wounds; of starvation; exposure; drowning; friendly fire; and atrocities. Medical treatments were changed drastically at this time. 'Napoleon's Surgeon', Baron Dominique Jean Larrey, used horse-drawn carts as ambulances to quickly remove the wounded from the field of battle. This method became so successful that he was subsequently asked to organize the medical care for the 14 armies of the French Republic. With the partial exception of the United Kingdom, all of the states at the time did not keep especially accurate records, so calculating losses is to a certain extent a matter of conjecture.

France, 1792–1815
 306,000 French killed in action
 600,000 civilians
 65,000 French allies killed in action
 800,000 French and allies killed by wounds, accidents or disease, primarily in the disastrous invasion of Russia
 1,800,000 French and allies  dead in action, disease, wounds and missing summary over Napoleonic Wars

Peninsular War:
 180,000–240,000 dead
 91,000 killed in action

Invasion of Russia:
 334,000 dead
 100,000 killed in action (70,000 French and 30,000 allied)

The effect of the war on France over this time period was considerable. Estimates of the total French losses during the wars vary from 500,000 to 3 million dead. According to David Gates, the Napoleonic Wars cost France at least 916,000 men from 1803 to 1815. This represents 38% of the conscription class of 1790–1795. This rate is over 14% higher than the losses suffered by the same generation one hundred years later fighting Imperial Germany. The French population suffered long-term effects through a low male-to-female population ratio. At the beginning of the Revolution, the numbers of males to females was virtually identical. By the end of the conflict only 0.857 males remained for every female. Combined with new agrarian laws under the Napoleonic Empire that required landowners to divide their lands to all their sons rather than the first born, France's population never recovered. By the middle of the 19th century France had lost its demographic superiority over Germany and Austria and the United Kingdom.

Coalition forces 

 120,000 Italian dead or missing.  
Russian: 289,000 killed in major battles.
Prussian: 134,000 killed in major battles.
Austrian: 376,000 killed in major battles.
Spanish: more than 300,000 military deaths – more than 586,000 killed
Portuguese: up to 250,000 dead or missing.
British: 311,806  dead or missing.
Killed in battle: 560,000–1,869,000
 Total: 2,380,000–5,925,084  

Royal Navy, 1804–1815:
killed in action: 6,663
shipwrecks, drownings, fire: 13,621
wounds, disease: 72,102

Total: 92,386.

British Army, 1804–1815:
killed in action: 25,569
wounds, accidents, disease: 193,851

Total: 219,420

Total dead and missing

 2,500,000 military personnel in Europe
 1,000,000 civilians were killed in Europe and in rebellious French overseas colonies.
 Total: 3,500,000 casualties

David Gates estimated that 5,000,000 died in the Napoleonic Wars. He does not specify if this number includes civilians or is just military.

Charles Esdaile says 5,000,000–7,000,000 died overall, including civilians. These numbers are subject to considerable variation. Erik Durschmied, in his book The Hinge Factor, gives a figure of 1.4 million French military deaths of all causes. Adam Zamoyski estimates that around 400,000 Russian soldiers died in the 1812 campaign alone. By contrast, Micheal Clodfelter gives the figure of 289,000 in Russian battles between 1805-1814. Civilian casualties in the 1812 campaign were probably comparable. Alan Schom estimates some 3 million military deaths in the Napoleonic wars and this figure, once again, is supported elsewhere. Common estimates of more than 500,000 French dead in Russia in 1812 and 250,000–300,000 French dead in Iberia between 1808 and 1814 give a total of at least 750,000, and to this must be added hundreds of thousands of more French dead in other campaigns—probably around 150,000 to 200,000 French dead in the German campaign of 1813, for example. Thus, it is fair to say that the estimates above are highly conservative.

Civilian deaths are impossible to accurately estimate. While military deaths are invariably put at between 2.5 million and 3.5 million, civilian death tolls vary from 750,000 to 3 million. Thus estimates of total dead, both military and civilian, range from 3,250,000 to 6,500,000.

See also
 List of British general officers killed in the French Revolutionary and Napoleonic Wars

Citations

References
 

 .
 
 . (See Matthew White.) White notes: "The era of almost continuous warfare that followed the overthrow of the French monarchy is traditionally split into three parts: The Revolution itself (including all internal conflicts) The Revolutionary Wars during which France fought international wars as a Republic" . White notes in section called "Main sequence" on another page "There's a string of authorities who seem to build their research on each other's earlier guesstimates: Sorokin, Small & Singer, Eckhardt, Levy, Rummel, the Correlates of War Project, etc. Most mainstream statistical analysis of war is based on these authorities; however, if you look at the individual authorities on the Main Sequence, you'll see that some have specific problems that carry over as they borrow from one another. See the wars in Algeria or South Africa for examples of how the Main Sequence agrees with itself and not with historians of the specific war" . White cites:
 
 
 
  cites four sources
 
 , cites Esdaile
 
 
 
 

Napoleonic Wars
War casualties by war